Bogdan Lalic (born 8 March 1964) is a Croatian chess grandmaster. He has the record of an unbeaten streak of 155 games.

He was born in Yugoslavia – Zagreb in 1964. FIDE awarded him the International Grandmaster title in 1988.

Notable achievements
 finished equal first at the GM Closed Pleven 1987 and GM Closed Sarajevo 1988 tournaments 
 1987: shared 1-3 I Ciudad de Badajoz Open, the winner on Bucholz 
 1987: winner of Avignon (Championnat France Rapidplay) 
 1987: winner of 12th Aubervilliers Rapidplay (Paris) 
 1988: winner of XVII Ciudad de Sevilla Open 
 1988: shared 1st place in Berlin Sommer Open 
 1991: shared 1st to 3rd place in Neu Isenburg Open (with GMs Eric Lobron and Alexander Chernin)
 1994: shared 1-2 (the winner on Bucholz) with GM Branko Damljanović in IV Paz de Ziganda Memorial Rapidplay (Pamplona) 
 1994: winner of Port Erin Open 
 1994: shared 1-2nd in XIV Benasque Open but 2nd place due to worse Bucholz (the winner was GM Lev Psakhis)
 1995: winner of Chess Classic Frankfurt West Schnellschach 
 1995–1996: shared 1st-3rd in Hastings Premier (together with GMs Alexander Khalifman and Stuart Conquest)
 1999: shared 1st-2nd in Kilkenny Masters (together with GM Julian Hodgson but the winner on Bucholz)
 2000: winner of II Memorial Pedro Zabala (Bilbao Rapidplay)
 2000: winner of III Memorial Zuri Baltza (Bilbao Rapidplay) 
 2001: shared 1st-4th (2nd place on Bucholz, the winner was GM Evgenij Agrest) in XXXI Rilton Cup  
 2002: winner of Redbus KO tournament Southend 
 2003: 2nd in British Championship Rapidplay 
 2008: shared 1st-2nd at Cork Masters (the winner was GM Dejan Bojkov)
 2008: shared 1st-3rd in the Open Neuchatel (with GMs Mark Hebden and Aloyzas Kveinys) – the winner on Bucholz
 2010: winner of 6th Tabor Open 
 2012: shared 2nd-7th in 30th Ville de Metz Open tournament 
 2012: shared 1st-2nd place Pardubice Rapidplay together with GM Rainer Buhmann (the winner on Bucholz)
 September 2012: winner of the closed GM tournament First Saturday in Budapest 
 2013: shared 1st-3rd (with GMs Azer Mirzoev and Alexei Barsov), the winner on Bucholz in Jaen IM closed tournament  
 2013: winner of XVII Torneo scacchi Cesenatico 2013
 2016: shared 1st at 12th Tabor Open (the winner on Bucholz)

He achieved his highest rating of 2600 in 1997. Although registered with the Croatian Federation, he divides his time between playing abroad and making frequent visits to England. He was once married to International Master Susan Lalic, England's first woman to hold the IM title, but they are now divorced. Together, they have a son, Peter Lalić, born 1994.

Lalic and Sergei Tiviakov both claim to have played a record 110 consecutive tournament games at classical time controls without losing, although neither player faced exclusively elite-level opponents during their unbeaten streaks. Lalic's streak occurred between 5 June 2006 and 3 March 2007.

Notable games 

1) Bogdan Lalic – Alexei Shirov; Moscow Olympiad 1994 (0.5 – 0.5)

2) Bogdan Lalic – Judith Polgar; Yerevan Olympiad 1996 (1 – 0)

3) Alexei Shirov – Bogdan Lalic; Yerevan Olympiad 1996 (0 – 1)

4) Bogdan Lalic – Tony Miles; Hastings Premier 1995/1996 (1 – 0)

5)  Bogdan Lalic – Krunoslav Hulak; Cro Cup (tt) 1996 (1 – 0)

6) Aleksej Aleksandrov – Bogdan Lalic; Pula EU ch. Teams 1997 (0 – 1)

7) Bogdan Lalic – Michał Krasenkow; Neum (tt) 2000 (1 – 0)

8) Bogdan Lalic – Evgeny Vorobiov; Cappelle la Grande 2012 (1 – 0)

9) Bogdan Lalic – Yaroslav Zherebukh; Cappelle la Grande 2012 (1 – 0)

10) Bogdan Lalic – Matthieu Cornette; Metz open 2012 (0.5 – 0.5)

11) Artyom Timofeev – Bogdan Lalic; Cappelle la Grande 2013 (0 – 1)

12)  Richard Bates – Bogdan Lalic; Bunratty Masters 2019 (0 – 1)

Books

 Bogdan Lalic, Vladimir Okhotnik, Carpathian Warrior (Caissa Hungary, 2005)
 Bogdan Lalic, Vladimir Okhotnik, Carpathian Warrior 2 (Pandora Press, 2008)

References

External links 
 
 Chess strategies Bogdan Lalic

1964 births
Living people
Chess grandmasters
Croatian chess players
Croatian chess writers